American Madness is a 1932 American pre-Code film directed by Frank Capra and starring Walter Huston as a New York banker embroiled in scandal.

Plot

At the Union National Bank, the directors are concerned because they think that bank president Tom Dickson has loaned too much money to people who are bad risks during the Great Depression era, and they threaten to replace him. Dickson refuses to resign, arguing that he loans to people whom he knows are good risks, that none of them has defaulted and that loaning the money keeps it circulating preventing an even worse economic depression.

Dickson's wife Phyllis is planning a special celebration for their anniversary, but he has forgotten it and made business plans. He promises to take her out the next night but then arranges another business meeting for the same time.

Three gangsters led by Dude Finlay enter the office of chief cashier Cyril Cluett to intimidate him. He owes them $50,000 in gambling debts, and they promise not to hurt him if he helps them rob the bank that night. They advise him to arrange an alibi for midnight, when the robbery will occur. Seeing Phyllis, Cluett claims to have always been in love with her and asks to take her out that night, and with Dickson unavailable, she agrees. However, they are seen by Matt Brown, who assumes the worst about Dickson's marriage.

Cluett resets the vault's time lock before leaving to meet Phyllis. They go to a play and then to his apartment, but Brown is there waiting for them, hoping to break up the affair. Meanwhile at the bank, the gang steals $100,000, but they also murder a guard who sees them.

The next day, rumors about the amount stolen become wildly exaggerated and cause a run on the bank. Dickson tries frantically to arrange emergency money to meet the withdrawals but cannot, and the board will not help, preferring to force him out. The bank has enough resources to pay all depositors eventually, but its reputation for safety will be ruined if the depositors cannot withdraw money immediately.

Meanwhile, the police suspect Brown, who will only say that he had been at home with a married woman whom he will not name. They hear that Cluett had been seen with Dude Finlay and turn their suspicions to him. Brown is cleared but blurts out Phyllis's name in Dickson's presence. Dickson also believes the worst about his marriage. He becomes depressed and agrees to resign his job.

As the bank runs out of cash, Dickson's subordinates have an idea. They call on the people whom Dickson has helped with loans in the past to deposit all the money that they can afford. They also call Phyllis, who reassures Dickson of her love. When the board sees the loyal depositors, they rally in support of Dickson, arranging immediate deliveries of money themselves. The bank is saved and Dickson recovers his positive attitude and keeps his job.

Dickson awards Brown a promotion, and urges Brown to marry his girlfriend, Dickson's own secretary Helen. He then asks Helen to arrange a luxurious sea voyage for himself and Phyllis.

Cast

Walter Huston as Thomas A. Dickson
Pat O'Brien as Matt
Kay Johnson as Mrs Phyllis Dickson
Constance Cummings as Helen
Gavin Gordon as Cyril Cluett
Arthur Hoyt as Ives
Robert Emmett O'Connor as Inspector

Production  
American Madness marked the first in a series of legendary collaborations between Frank Capra and Robert Riskin. It was also Riskin's first original screenplay.

The film contains one zoom shot, which is notable for its use of the new three-element Cooke-Varo lens.

References

External links 
 
Six Screen Plays by Robert Riskin, Edited and Introduced by Pat McGilligan, Berkeley:  University of California Press,  c1997 1997 - Free Online - UC Press E-Books Collection

1932 films
1932 drama films
American drama films
American black-and-white films
Columbia Pictures films
Films directed by Frank Capra
Films set in New York City
Films with screenplays by Robert Riskin
1930s English-language films
1930s American films